Mary Lou (German:Mary-Lou) is a 1928 German silent film directed by Frederic Zelnik and starring Lya Mara, Fred Louis Lerch and Ivan Koval-Samborsky.

The film's art direction was by Andrej Andrejew. It was released by the German branch of First National Pictures.

Cast
 Lya Mara as Mary-Lou 
 Fred Louis Lerch as Felix Rimsky  
 Ivan Koval-Samborsky as Rigoletto  
 Fritz Kampers as Belloni  
 Adele Sandrock as Frau Belloni  
 Hans Mierendorff as Großfürst Dimitri  
 Rudolf Biebrach as Kapitän Lund  
 S.Z. Sakall as Der Jongleur  
 Harry Grunwald 
 Max Maximilian as Strolch  
 Paul Rehkopf as Strolch  
 Bobby Burns as Bobby

References

Bibliography
 Bock, Hans-Michael & Bergfelder, Tim. The Concise CineGraph. Encyclopedia of German Cinema. Berghahn Books, 2009.

External links

1928 films
Films of the Weimar Republic
Films directed by Frederic Zelnik
German silent feature films
German black-and-white films